Halifax County Schools may refer to:

 Halifax County Public Schools in Virginia
 Halifax County Schools (North Carolina)

See also
 Halifax Regional School Board which covers Halifax County, Nova Scotia